ZFB-TV (channel 7) is a television station in Hamilton, Bermuda, serving the British territory as an affiliate of ABC. It is owned by the Bermuda Broadcasting Company alongside CBS affiliate ZBM-TV (channel 9). The two stations share studios on Fort Hill Road in Devonshire Parish.

History
ZFB-TV was founded in August 1965 by Capital Broadcasting Company Ltd. Originally, the station broadcast on VHF channel 8. In 1982, Capital Broadcasting Company merged with Bermuda Broadcasting Company and ZFB-TV was moved to channel 7.

Technical information

Subchannel

Analog-to-digital conversion
On the week of March 9, 2016, Bermuda Broadcasting ended analog broadcasts and converted ZFB-TV and ZBM-TV to digital using ATSC, with both services sharing a multiplex on channel 20. The transmitter was knocked out of service some time later when lightning struck the transmitter. In 2017, in time for the America's Cup, Bermuda Broadcasting completed an upgrade that added a second transmitter for ZFB, using virtual channel 19.7, allowing both ZFB and ZBM to broadcast in HD; it also replaced its radio transmitters.

References

External links
 Official website
 Bermuda News media

Television stations in Bermuda
ABC network affiliates
Television channels and stations established in 1965
1965 establishments in Bermuda
Transnational network affiliates